Tielu is a metro station on Line 1 and Line 14 of Zhengzhou Metro.

The station is approximately 1 km south of the railway station with the same name on the Longhai Railway.

Station layout  
The station has 2 floors underground. The B1 floor is for the station concourse and the B2 floor is for the platforms and tracks. The station has two island platforms on its B2 floor. Currently the platforms for Line 1 and Line 14 are in operation. The platforms for Line 14 are located to the west of Line 1.

Exits

Surroundings
 Zhengzhou No. 36 Middle School
 The PLA No. 153 Hospital

References 

Stations of Zhengzhou Metro
Line 1, Zhengzhou Metro
Line 14, Zhengzhou Metro
Railway stations in China opened in 2017